The sexuality of Adolf Hitler, dictator of Germany from 1933 to 1945, has long been a matter of historical and scholarly debate, as well as speculation and rumour. There is evidence that he had relationships with a number of women during his lifetime, as well as evidence of his antipathy to homosexuality, and no evidence of homosexual encounters. His name has been linked to a number of possible female lovers, two of whom committed suicide. A third died of complications eight years after a suicide attempt, and a fourth also attempted suicide.

Adolf Hitler created a public image of a celibate man without a domestic life, dedicated entirely to his political mission and the governance of Nazi Germany. His relationship with Eva Braun, which lasted nearly 14 years, was hidden from the public and all but his inner circle. Braun biographer Heike Görtemaker notes that the couple enjoyed a normal sex life. Hitler and Braun married in late April 1945, less than 40 hours before committing suicide together.

Two wartime reports by the Allies attempted to analyse Hitler psychologically. A 1943 report by Walter C. Langer for the U.S. Office of Strategic Services (OSS) describes Hitler as having repressed homosexual tendencies and opined that he was an impotent coprophile. Psychologist Henry Murray wrote a separate psychoanalytical report for the OSS in 1943 that drew similar conclusions. Otto Strasser, one of Hitler's opponents in the Nazi Party, also told his post-war interrogators a similar story. British historian Sir Ian Kershaw describes Strasser's statement as "anti-Hitler propaganda".

In research following Hitler's death, a variety of claims have been made about Hitler's sexual orientation: that he was gay, bisexual, or asexual. Conclusive evidence is lacking, but most historians believe he was heterosexual. There is at least one claim that Hitler had an illegitimate child (named Jean-Marie Loret) with one of his lovers. Mainstream historians, such as Kershaw, dismiss this as unlikely or impossible.

Historical accounts

Hitler's sex life has long been the subject of speculation and rumours, many of which were invented or "spiced up" by his political enemies. While the sexual preferences of many members of Hitler's inner circle are known, conclusive evidence of Hitler's sexuality is lacking. The evidence that exists about Hitler's private life is largely from people in his inner circle, such as his adjutants, his secretaries, Albert Speer, the Wagner family, and others. There is evidence that he had infatuations with several women, as well as evidence of his antipathy to homosexuality, and no evidence that he engaged in homosexual behaviour. British historian Sir Ian Kershaw describes him as being repelled by personal contact and sexual activity, including homosexuality and prostitution, especially as a young man in Vienna. He was afraid of contracting a sexually transmitted infection.

Kershaw notes that as a soldier during the First World War, Hitler did not take part in discussions of sex with his comrades. When teased about his celibacy during this period, Hitler responded by saying "I'd die of shame looking for sex with a French girl," and "Have you no German sense of honour left at all?" When asked by a comrade if he had ever loved a girl, Hitler replied "I've never had time for anything like that, and I'll never get round to it."

Relationships with women

Hitler created a public image of a celibate man without a domestic life, dedicated entirely to his political mission. He considered himself to be attractive to women, partly because of his position of power. Speer recalled him stating a preference for unintelligent women who would not challenge him about his work or prevent him from relaxing in his leisure time. Kershaw speculates that Hitler preferred younger women who were easy to dominate and mould. He notes that at least three of Hitler's close female associates (Eva Braun, Geli Raubal, and Maria Reiter) were far younger than himself: Braun was 23 years younger, Raubal was 19 years younger, and Reiter was 21 years his junior.

Ernst Hanfstaengl, one of the members of Hitler's inner circle in the early years in Munich, wrote that "I felt Hitler was a case of a man who was neither fish, flesh nor fowl, neither fully homosexual nor fully heterosexual ... I had formed the firm conviction that he was impotent, the repressed, masturbating type." Nevertheless, Hanfstaengl was convinced enough of Hitler's heterosexuality that he unsuccessfully tried to encourage a romantic relationship between Hitler and Martha Dodd, daughter of the American ambassador. According to Hanfstaengl, filmmaker Leni Riefenstahl tried to begin a relationship with Hitler early on, but he turned her down. Magda Goebbels invited Hitler to parties to encourage him to meet women, but he showed no interest. When pro-Nazi foreign women like Unity Mitford visited, Hitler usually lectured them about politics.

Geli Raubal

Hitler was deeply attached to his half-niece Geli Raubal, 19 years his junior. She began living at his residence after her mother became Hitler's housekeeper in 1925. Although the exact nature and extent of their relationship is unknown, Kershaw describes it as a latent "sexual dependence". It was rumoured among contemporaries that they were in a romantic relationship. Geli committed suicide with Hitler's gun in his Munich apartment in September 1931. Her death was a source of deep, lasting pain for Hitler.

Eva Braun

Hitler's relationship with Braun, which lasted nearly 14 years, was hidden from the public and all but his inner circle. Within that circle (most of whom survived the war), he was open about Braun, and they lived together at Berchtesgaden as a couple. Hitler's valet, Heinz Linge, stated in his memoirs that Hitler and Braun had two bedrooms and two bathrooms with interconnecting doors at the Berghof, and Hitler would end most evenings alone with her in his study before they retired to bed. She would wear a "dressing gown or house-coat" and drink wine; Hitler would have tea. Braun biographer Heike Görtemaker notes that the couple enjoyed a normal sex life. Braun's friends and relatives described her giggling over a 1938 photograph of Neville Chamberlain sitting on a sofa in Hitler's Munich flat with the remark: "If only he knew what goings-on that sofa has seen."

Hitler's letters provide evidence that he was fond of her, and worried when she participated in sports or was late returning for tea. His secretary Traudl Junge stated that during the war, Hitler telephoned Braun every day. He was concerned for her safety when she was staying in the Munich home he had bought her. Junge further asked Hitler once why he never married. Hitler replied, "...I wouldn't have been able to give enough time to my wife". Hitler told her that he didn't want children, as they would have had "...a very hard time, because they're expected to possess the same gifts as their famous parents and they can't be forgiven for being mediocre." In the end, Hitler and Braun married in the Berlin Führerbunker in late April 1945, less than 40 hours before committing suicide together.

Views on homosexuality

Ernst Röhm was Hitler's closest friend—the only person who called him "Adolf". Hitler continued to support him during the Röhm scandal of 1931–1932 in which the Münchener Post disclosed Röhm's homosexuality, but historian Laurie Marhoefer argues that this is not evidence of Hitler's homosexuality. Historian Andrew Wackerfuss argues that Hitler had no personal discomfort with homosexuality, but that he found it convenient politically to instrumentalize homophobia to justify the 1934 Night of the Long Knives. Despite the fact that Hitler had previously tolerated the homosexuality of Röhm and other SA leaders, the charges of immorality were effective in gaining the support of the German population for the political murders. In August 1941, Hitler declared that "homosexuality is actually as infectious and as dangerous as the plague", and supported SS leader Heinrich Himmler's efforts to remove gay men from the military and the SS. Homosexuality was not one of Hitler's priorities, compared to the Jewish question. The Nazi Party held anti-homosexual views, declaring in 1928 that "anyone who even thinks of homosexual love is our enemy." Hitler's regime persecuted homosexuals, sending an estimated 5,000 to 15,000 to concentration camps; some 2,500 to 7,500 of these died.

Allegation of pederasty

Hermann Rauschning claimed to have seen in Hitler's First World War military record an item concerning a court martial that found Hitler guilty of pederastic practices with an officer. Rauschning also claimed that in Munich, Hitler was found guilty of a violation of Paragraph 175, which dealt with pederasty. No evidence of either of these two charges has been found.

Langer's and Murray's wartime OSS reports

In 1943, the American Office of Strategic Services (OSS) received A Psychological Analysis of Adolf Hitler: His Life and Legend by Walter C. Langer, commissioned  to help the Allies understand the dictator. The report, later expanded into book form as The Mind of Adolf Hitler: The Secret Wartime Report (1972), describes Hitler as having repressed homosexual tendencies and states that he was an impotent coprophile. Psychologist Henry Murray wrote a separate psychoanalytical report for OSS also in 1943, entitled Analysis of the Personality of Adolph Hitler: With Predictions of His Future Behavior and Suggestions for Dealing with Him Now and After Germany's Surrender. He also dealt with Hitler's alleged coprophilia, but overall diagnosed Hitler a schizophrenic. One of Hitler's opponents in the Nazi Party, Otto Strasser, told OSS interrogators that the Nazi dictator forced Geli Raubal to urinate and defecate on him. Kershaw contends that stories circulated by Strasser as to alleged "sexual deviant practices ought to be viewed as ... anti-Hitler propaganda."

Recent allegations
In research following his death, a variety of claims have been made about Hitler's sexuality: that he was gay, bisexual, or asexual, or may have engaged in sexual activity with his half-niece, Geli Raubal.

Jack Nusan Porter of the University of Massachusetts Lowell wrote in 1998: "Did Hitler despise homosexuals? Was he ashamed of his own homosexual identity? These are areas of psychohistory that are beyond known knowledge. My own feelings are that Hitler was asexual in the traditional sense and had bizarre sexual fetishes."

Historian Lothar Machtan argues in The Hidden Hitler (2001) that Hitler was homosexual. The book speculates about Hitler's experiences in Vienna with young friends, his adult relationships with (among others) Röhm, Hanfstaengl, and Emil Maurice, and includes a study of the Mend Protocol, a series of allegations made to the Munich Police in the early 1920s by Hans Mend, who served with Hitler during World War I. The American journalist Ron Rosenbaum is highly critical of Machtan's work, saying his "evidence falls short of being conclusive and often falls far short of being evidence at all." Most scholars dismiss Machtan's claims, and believe Hitler was heterosexual. In 2004, HBO produced a documentary film based on Machtan's theory, titled Hidden Führer: Debating the Enigma of Hitler's Sexuality.

Possible relationships
Adolf Hitler's name has been linked romantically with a number of women other than Eva Braun.

See also
 Possible monorchism of Adolf Hitler
 Psychopathography of Adolf Hitler

References
Citations

Bibliography

 
 
 
 
 
 
 
 
 

 
 
 
 
 
 
 
 
 
 
 
 
 
 

 
 
 
 
 
 
 
 
 

  

Fringe theories
Hitler, Adolf
Hitler, Adolf
Hitler, Adolf
Views on Adolf Hitler